Tobias Skelton Roland-Jones (born 29 January 1988) is an English cricketer. 

A medium-fast, right-arm bowler and a lower order right-handed batsman, Roland-Jones represents Middlesex in county cricket, and has represented England at Test and One Day International level. 

He was appointed as Middlesex club captain for the 2023 season.

Early life and career
Roland-Jones was born in Ashford now in Surrey but historically in Middlesex.

County career
On 23 September 2016, Roland-Jones took a hat-trick against Yorkshire to secure the County Championship for Middlesex for the first time in 23 years. He was named one of the Wisden 2017's Cricketers of the year.

In September 2017, Roland-Jones suffered a lower-back stress fracture whilst playing for Middlesex and was consequently unavailable for selection for the England winter tours to Australia and New Zealand. On his return to county cricket in April 2018, a recurrence of the injury was predicted to rule him out of the 2018 season.

On 26 July 2019, in the 2019 t20 Blast match against Glamorgan, Roland-Jones took a hat-trick, finishing with career-best figures of 5 for 21.

International career
In July 2016 he was named in England's squad for their Test series against Pakistan. However, he was dropped from the squad after Ben Stokes and James Anderson were recalled to the England squad for the second Test against Pakistan at Old Trafford. He made his One Day International (ODI) debut for England against South Africa on 29 May 2017.

He made his Test debut for England against South Africa on 27 July 2017  and took five wickets in his first Test match, ripping through the South African top four and completing his maiden five-for by removing Temba Bavuma. He was the first Englishman to take a five-for on debut since Adil Rashid in 2015. Roland-Jones also showed that he is a capable lower order batsmen by adding 25 in the first innings (including four fours and one six) and 23 not out (two sixes) in the second innings.

See also
 List of England cricketers who have taken five-wicket hauls on Test debut

References

External links
 

1988 births
Living people
English cricketers
England Test cricketers
England One Day International cricketers
Marylebone Cricket Club cricketers
Middlesex cricket captains 
Middlesex cricketers 
North v South cricketers
Wisden Cricketers of the Year
People from Ashford, Surrey
English cricketers of the 21st century